Lorenza Bernot Krauze (born August 16, 1988) is a Mexican beauty pageant contestant who competed in the Miss International 2008 pageant.

Born in Mexico City and raised in Cuernavaca, Morelos from the age of five, Lorenza Bernot competed against thirty-three other contestants for the national beauty title of Mexico, Nuestra Belleza Mexico, held in Manzanillo, Colima on October 5, 2007. Despite not winning, the nineteen-year-old was chosen to represent Mexico in the 2008 Miss International pageant, held in the Chinese region of Macau on November 8, 2008.

References

1988 births
People from Cuernavaca
Living people
Miss International 2008 delegates
Mexican beauty pageant winners
Mexican people of French descent
Mexican people of German descent